Oakland is a town in Orange County, Florida, United States. The population was 3,516 at the 2020 Census, representing a growth of 38.5% over the population of 2,538 recorded during the 2010 census.  It is part of the Orlando–Kissimmee Metropolitan Statistical Area.

Geography

History

In 1860, a Post Office opened in Oakland, and closed in 1867. During the Civil War, the Post Office at Oakland was the only one operating within the present-day boundaries of Orange County, as Orlando's was closed from 1861 to 1866. Oakland Post Office reopened in 1877. During a time of great growth in the region during the 1880s, Oakland emerged as the center of commerce in west Orange County. It appeared that the village would blossom into a city, with the town incorporating in 1887. However, a fire in the business district and a subsequent period of freezes in rapid succession throughout the 1890s, along with the growth of nearby Winter Garden, seemed to ensure that Oakland would remain as little more than a sleepy village. In 1940, Oakland surpassed nearby Maitland in Population, ranking at #6 in the county. In 1950, however, Oakland fell back to #7, with a population of 545, the majority of whom were black.

Demographics

As of the 2010 census, there were 2,538 people, 846 households, and 685 families residing in the city. The population density was 1,209.15 person per square mile (466.54/km). There were 931 housing units. The racial makeup of the city was 67.84% White, 20.45% African American, 0.6% Native American, 4.8% Asian, 2.87% from other races, and 3.03% from two or more races. Hispanic or Latino of any race were 10.01% of the population. Compared to the 2000 Census, the town experienced over a 10% decrease in the proportion of African Americans (which was nearly a third of the population in 2000), while the Asian population more than quadruped as a proportion of the population, and the Hispanic population tripled as a share of population.

There were 846 households, out of which 40.3% had children under the age of 18 living with them, 64.9% were married couples living together, 11.7% had a female householder with no husband present, and 19.0% were non-families. 14.2% of all households were made up of individuals, and 3.2% had someone living alone who was 65 years of age or older. The average household size was 2.99 and the average family size was 3.32. Compared to the 2000 Census, Oakland has become more family dominant, with a decrease in both its share of senior citizen population and non-family households.

In the town, the population was spread out, with 29.3% under the age of 19, 5.5% from 20 to 24, 25.7% from 25 to 44, 30% from 45 to 64, and 9.3% who were 65 years of age or older. The median age was 39 years. For every 100 females, there were 93.1 males. For every 100 females age 18 and over, there were 90.5 males.

The median income for a household in the city was $100,927, and the median income for a family was $102,396. Males had a median income of $65,781 versus $54,444 for females. The per capita income for the city was $39,802. About 6.1% of families and 6.9% of the population were below the poverty line, including 5.5% of those under age 18. Oakland has seen an explosion of wealth compared to the American Community Survey numbers last released with the 2000 Census. Comparatively, the median income for households and families has more than doubled while the per capita income increased by nearly 75%. Meanwhile, poverty as a whole has stayed statistically the same.

Education

Orange County Public Schools operates public schools in the county. Zoned schools include: 
 Tildenville Elementary School
 Lakeview Middle School
 West Orange High School

The town government operates the Oakland Avenue Charter School (OACS).  it has 536 students.

References

External links
 Town of Oakland official website
 

Towns in Orange County, Florida
Greater Orlando
Towns in Florida